Cypronia (formerly Cypron Studios, originally Ablaze Entertainment) is a Slovak indie video game developer based in Michalovce. Cypronia is largely a Microsoft Windows, Nintendo DS, Nintendo DSi, Nintendo 3DS, Wii U, Nintendo Switch, Xbox One and PlayStation 4 developer.

History
Cypronia began in 1997 under the name Ablaze Entertainment, releasing two games for the Commodore Amiga series of personal computers. In 2001, they changed their name to Cypron Studios, along with changing their focus to Microsoft Windows development. After releasing several games, mostly in the real-time strategy genre, they once again switched platforms to the Nintendo DS, bringing with them the new name of Cypronia.

Cypronia gained popularity when they released Cube Life: Island Survival, a sandbox video game for the Wii U. The game reached #1 in the Europe, #2 in the American and #3 in the Japanese Nintendo eShop charts.

Released games
Release year and platform each refer to the original (first released) version. Later releases on other platforms are therefore not taken into account in this list.
The Strangers (1997, Amiga, real-time strategy game)
Napalm: Crimson Crisis (1999, Amiga, real-time strategy game)
State of War (2001, Microsoft Windows, real-time strategy game)
State of War: Warmonger (2003, Microsoft Windows, real-time strategy game, a sequel to State of War)
Gods: Lands of Infinity (2006, Microsoft Windows, turn-based RPG)
Logitech's Golf (2006, Microsoft Windows)
Gods: Lands of Infinity: Special Edition (2007, Microsoft Windows, rehaul of Gods: Lands of Infinity)
State of War 2: Arcon (2007, Microsoft Windows, multiplayer-focused real-time strategy game)
Command and Destroy (2008, Nintendo DS, real-time strategy game)
1 vs. 100 (2008, Nintendo DS, quiz game based on popular TV show 1 vs. 100 by Endemol)
Jagged Alliance (2008, Nintendo DS, DS adaptation of Jagged Alliance PC franchise)
Cube Life: Island Survival (2015, Wii U, sandbox survival game)
Cube Life: Pixel Action Heroes (2017, Wii U, sandbox first person shooter game)
Pixel Action Heroes (2018, Nintendo Switch, remake of Cube Life: Pixel Action Heroes)
Cube Life: Island Survival HD (2018, Microsoft Windows, remake of Cube Life: Island Survival)
State of War: Warmonger (2018, Microsoft Windows, port for newer computer systems, contains State of War and State of War: Warmonger)
Angry Bunnies: Colossal Carrot Crusade (2019)
Medieval (2022, Microsoft Windows)

References

External links
Official website

Official Gods: Lands of Infinity website

Video game companies established in 1997
Video game companies of Slovakia
1997 establishments in Slovakia
Video game development companies